Terry Berlier (born 1972, in Cincinnati, Ohio) is an artist and sculptor whose work addresses themes of the environment and queer practice. Her work incorporates kinetic and sound based media to address these themes.

Life
Berlier holds a Bachelor of Fine Arts (BFA) from Miami University in Ohio  and a Master of Fine Arts (MFA) from the University of California, Davis in 2003.

She has taught in the Stanford University Department of Art and Art History since 2007, and currently serves as an Associate Professor and the Director of the Sculpture Lab.

She was a volunteer for the United States Peace Corps in Jamaica from 1992 to 1995, which became inspiration for some of her works.

Work
Her sculptures, which frequently incorporate elements of sound and interactivity, have been described as "cumbersome, mildly comical contraptions." In order to gain more insight on how she wants to create her work, she discusses and plans with other professionals outside of her field, such as engineers and architects.

In 2012, she participated as an artist-in-residence at San Francisco Recology's Art At The Dump program, and since 2013 has served on its board. During her time as artist-in-residence at Recology, Berlier obtained raw material for her work from the dump. Though not all of her materials are found objects, she said that, "appropriated objects have had an ongoing presence in my work. The found object has had a long history in art and I had actually found myself moving away from it in projects prior to the Recology residency."

Solo Exhibitions 
Berlier has 20 solo exhibitions on her CV spanning from 2000 to 2021. She has exhibited her work all over the United States, as well as Japan, Norway, and Spain.

Her most recent solo exhibition, A Kind of Ache (2021), took place at The Clarice gallery at the University of Maryland in collaboration with composer Sarah Heinnes and the band The Living Earth, who played music during the show. In 2017 her exhibition Resounding Desire Lines was featured at the Center for New Music in San Francisco, CA. Her sculptures, designed with kinetics and interactivity, were displayed as a part of the Maker Music Festival. In 2014 at the Weston Art Gallery in Cincinnati, Ohio her exhibition Time Slip displayed two of her large-scale works that represent the environment and time perception: Standard Time and Not So Solid Earth. Her exhibition Sounding Board (2012) at the Thomas Welton Art Gallery at Stanford University displayed four of her kinetic sculptures, including Play, This Side Up Handle With Care, a treehouse sculpture. During her Recology Residency in San Francisco, CA, Berlier exhibited with other artists in residency Donna Anderson Kam and Ethan Estess. her sculptures were ones that "metaphorically excavate and honor these [modern] inventions and our intertwined relationships to them." One of her earliest solo exhibitions that gained coverage was Open Secret (2011) at the San Francisco Arts Commission Grove Street Gallery. This exhibition featured found web photos of nuclear waste and nuclear plants as a response to nuclear issues.

Group Exhibitions 
Berlier has done many collaborations with other artists. Her most recent work, Pulled Apart, was featured in the University of San Francisco's Thacher Gallery. This collaboration piece interweaved mechanical movement and sound to demonstrate an exploration of human connection and identity. In 2019 she collaborated with other artists including Mungo Thomson and Angela Willetts on an exhibition in Sacramento's Verge Gallery. The exhibition, which was curated by Francesca Wilmott, was also accompanied by the two-volume book, Slant Step Book: The Mysterious Object and the Artworks. In this same year she collaborated with other artists and composers including Terry Peterson, Rachel Clarke, Stephen Blumberg, Belinda Hanson, Robin Hill, Boris Allenou, Sam Nicholes, Kadet Kuhne, and Shih-Wen Young on Seeing Sound 2. This exhibition was curated by Natalie Nelson in partnership with "June is Music Month" to culminate sculptures, sounds, and videos. She also collaborated with other primarily Bay area artists, who were recruited to demonstrate their perspective on consumerism, on the Natalie + James Thompson Art Gallery in San Jose State University.

In 2013, Berlier participated in two notable expositions. The first one is called Even the Windmills are Weakening. This was featured in Recology Art at the Dump. Here, artists create pieces using recycled materials. The second piece is also made from recycled material. Berlier created the Acoustic Locator and it was showcased at the SFO museum.

References

External links

 

1972 births
Artists from Cincinnati
Living people
Miami University alumni
Stanford University Department of Art and Art History faculty
University of California, Davis alumni
Sculptors from Ohio